Bumahen (also Romanized as Būmahen, Būm-e Hen, and Būmehen; also known as Bumahind and Būm Hend) is a city in, and the capital of, Bumehen District of Pardis County, Tehran province, Iran. At the 2006 census, its population was 43,004 in 11,667 households, when it was in the Central District of Tehran County. The following census in 2011 counted 53,451 people in 15,729 households. The latest census in 2016 showed a population of 79,034 people in 24,385 households, by which time it had become the capital of the newly formed Bumehen District in Pardis County.

References 

Pardis County

Cities in Tehran Province

Populated places in Tehran Province

Populated places in Pardis County